Brenthia sapindella is a moth of the family Choreutidae. It is known from Cuba.

The length of the forewings is 3.6-3.8 mm for males and 3.8–4 mm for females.

The larvae feed on Sapindus raponarius.

References

Brenthia
Endemic fauna of Cuba